Coleophora punctulatella is a moth of the family Coleophoridae. It is found in southern France, Spain and Hungary.

The larvae feed on Camphorosma monspeliaca. They create a small, dark brown, squat tubular silken case with a very oblique mouth angle. They feed on the fruits.

References

punctulatella
Moths of Europe
Moths described in 1849